This article contains the discography of American R&B singer Karyn White. This includes studio albums, compilation albums, and singles.

Albums

Studio albums

Compilation albums

Singles

As lead artist

As featured artist

Music videos

References

External links
 Official website

Karyn White at VH1

Discographies of American artists
Rhythm and blues discographies